Tobias Schwede (born 17 March 1994) is a German professional footballer who plays as a midfielder for  club Saarbrücken.

Career
In June 2022 it was announced Schwede would join 3. Liga club 1. FC Saarbrücken from 2. Bundesliga side Hansa Rostock.

References

External links
 

1994 births
Living people
Footballers from Bremen
German footballers
Association football midfielders
SV Werder Bremen II players
1. FC Magdeburg players
SC Paderborn 07 players
SV Wehen Wiesbaden players
FC Hansa Rostock players
1. FC Saarbrücken players
2. Bundesliga players
3. Liga players